The Summit Lake Ranger Station, also known as the Summit Lake Patrol Cabin, is one of the first three buildings constructed by the National Park Service in Lassen Volcanic National Park, California. Located near the center of the park on the main park road, the cabin was built in 1926. The main portion of the station comprises a living area, kitchen, and two bedrooms. A former porch has been enclosed and houses a bathroom.

The Summit Lake Ranger Station was placed on the National Register of Historic Places on April 3, 1978. It is a contributing structure on the Lassen Volcanic National Park Highway Historic District.

References

National Register of Historic Places in Lassen Volcanic National Park
Park buildings and structures on the National Register of Historic Places in California
National Park Service rustic in California
National Park Service ranger stations
National Register of Historic Places in Shasta County, California
1957 establishments in California